
Listed below are executive orders numbered 1051-1743 and presidential proclamations signed by United States President William Howard Taft. His executive orders and presidential proclamations are also listed on WikiSource.

Executive orders

1909

1910

1911

1912

1913

Presidential proclamations

1909

1910

1912

1913

References

 
United States federal policy
William Howard Taft-related lists